The novel The Letter Bearer was critically acclaimed when it was published in 2014.

Author Robert Allison was nominated for, or won several prestigious awards, including the McKitterick Prize.  The novel was shortlisted for the 2014 Desmond Elliott Prize.

References

2014 British novels
2014 debut novels
Granta Books books